Sgurr a' Mhuilinn (879 m) is a mountain in Highland, Scotland.

References

Mountains and hills of the Northwest Highlands
Marilyns of Scotland
Corbetts